= Lisa Claire du Toit =

- Born: 24 April 1983 (age 43)
- Citizenship: South Africa
- Occupations: Researcher, Academic
- Known for: Pharmaceutical Chemistry
- Title: Professor

Academic background
- Education: University of the Witwatersrand
- Thesis: A Bioresponsive Polymeric Implant for Site-Specific Prolonged Drug Delivery
- Doctoral advisor: Professor Viness Pillay

Academic work
- Discipline: Pharmacy
- Institutions: University of the Witwatersrand

Lisa Claire du Toit is a South African inventor, scientist, researcher, and a university professor at University of the Witwatersrand, Johannesburg, South Africa.

== Early life ==
Claire du Toit was born on 24 April 1983.

== Education ==
Claire du Toit holds a Bachelors degree in Pharmacy(B.Pharm (cum laude), a Masters degree in Pharmacy (M.Pharm (cum laude), and a Doctor of Philosophy degree (PhD) from University of the Witwatersrand, Johannesburg, South Africa.

== Career ==
Claire du Toit is an Associate Professor of Pharmaceutical Chemistry and Senior Scientist of the Wits Advanced Drug Delivery Platform Research Unit (WADDP) in the Department of Pharmacy and Pharmacology of the University of the Witwatersrand, Johannesburg, South Africa, where she also lectures.

Her inventions include 9 granted patents and several PCT applications filed internationally.

== Publications ==
- Advances in Polysaccharide- and Synthetic Polymer-Based Vitreous Substitutes
- A nano-enabled biotinylated anti-LDL theranostic system to modulate systemic LDL cholesterol
- A nano-enclatherated-gel-composite for the treatment of alcohol abuse and addiction
- Investigation of the 3D Printability of Covalently Cross-Linked Polypeptide-Based Hydrogels
- Tuberculosis chemotherapy: current drug delivery approaches

== Awards and recognition ==
- She was included in Stanford’s World Top 2% Scientists list among the Top 5 in the School of Therapeutic Sciences.
- She was awarded a Friedel Sellschop Award in 2014 which recognizes and supports exceptional young researchers.
- She was also inducted as a member of the South African Young Academy of Scientists (SAYAS) in 2014
- She was second runner-up in the Women in Science Awards in 2015, in the category in the Distinguished Young Women Researchers Category.
- She received The World Academy of Sciences (TWAS) Young Affiliateship in 2019
- In 2020, she was short-listed as a finalist for the 2019/2020 NSTF-South32 Awards in the category: TW Kambule-NSTF Award: Emerging Researcher.
- She was inducted as a member of the Academy of Science of South Africa (ASSAf) in 2023.
